The 2016–17 A-League was the 40th season of top-flight soccer in Australia, and the 12th since the establishment of the A-League in 2004. The season began on 7 October 2016.

Adelaide United were both the defending A-League Premiers and Champions. The 2017 Grand Final took place on 7 May 2017, with Sydney FC claiming their third Championship with a 1–1 (4–2 on penalties) win against Melbourne Victory. Sydney FC also claimed the premiership for the 2016–17 regular season, their second in club history.

Clubs

Personnel and kits

Transfers

Managerial changes

Foreign players
 
The following do not fill a Visa position:
1Those players who were born and started their professional career abroad but have since gained Australian citizenship (and New Zealand citizenship, in the case of Wellington Phoenix);
2Australian citizens (and New Zealand citizens, in the case of Wellington Phoenix) who have chosen to represent another national team;
3Injury Replacement Players, or National Team Replacement Players;
4Guest Players (eligible to play a maximum of fourteen games)

Salary cap exemptions and captains

Regular season

League table

Results

Finals series

Elimination-finals

Semi-finals

Grand Final

Statistics

Attendances

By club
These are the attendance records of each of the teams at the end of the home and away season. The table does not include finals series attendances.

By round

Club membership

Player stats

Top scorers

Hat-tricks

† - On 24 March 2017 Besart Berisha switched nationalities from Albania to Kosovo.

Own goals

Clean sheets

NB - An additional clean sheet was kept by Melbourne City, however this is not listed due to a goalkeeper substitution.

Discipline
During the season each club is given fair play points based on the number of cards they received in games. A yellow card is worth 1 point, a second yellow card is worth 2 points, and a red card is worth 3 points. At the annual awards night, the club with the fewest  points wins the Fair Play Award.

End-of-season awards
The following end of the season awards were announced at the 2016–17 Dolan Warren Awards night held at the Star Event Centre in Sydney on 1 May 2017.
 Johnny Warren Medal – Miloš Ninković, Sydney FC
 NAB Young Footballer of the Year – Jamie Maclaren, Brisbane Roar
 Nike Golden Boot Award – Besart Berisha, Melbourne Victory & Jamie Maclaren, Brisbane Roar (19 goals each)
 Goalkeeper of the Year – Danny Vukovic, Sydney FC
 Coach of the Year – Graham Arnold, Sydney FC
 Fair Play Award – Central Coast Mariners
 Referee of the Year – Jarred Gillett
 Goal of the Year – Tim Cahill, Melbourne City (Melbourne Victory v Melbourne City, 15 October 2016)

See also

 2016–17 Adelaide United FC season
 2016–17 Brisbane Roar FC season
 2016–17 Central Coast Mariners FC season
 2016–17 Melbourne City FC season
 2016–17 Melbourne Victory FC season
 2016–17 Newcastle Jets FC season
 2016–17 Perth Glory FC season
 2016–17 Sydney FC season
 2016–17 Wellington Phoenix FC season
 2016–17 Western Sydney Wanderers FC season

Notes

References

 
A-League Men seasons
Aus
1
1